Shabeer Kallarakkal is an Indian stage and film actor, best known for his role as "Dancing Rose" in Sarpatta Parambarai (2021).

Career 
Shabeer appeared in an uncredited role in Aayutha Ezhuthu (2004). He later became a theatre artiste. Shabeer made his full-fledged feature film debut by playing the lead role in Lakshmy Ramakrishnan's Nerungi Vaa Muthamidathe (2014). Featuring alongside actresses Pia Bajpiee and Sruthi Hariharan, Shabeer portrayed a lorry driver caught up in a petrol crisis. On the back of his performance in his first film, he was cast in 54321 (2016). Shabeer portrayed the lead antagonist in the film, with the director stating that he chose the actor because of his experience in theatre performances and his ability to act.

In 2018, Shabeer portrayed a small role in Adanga Maru (2018). He was later signed by Karthik Subbaraj to play a role in Petta (2019).

Filmography 
         
Documentaries
Where The Trees Sing (2017)

References

External links 

21st-century Indian male actors
Indian male film actors
Living people
Male actors in Tamil cinema
1982 births